New York is an unincorporated community located in Ballard County, Kentucky, United States. It has a population of 10, and is about 19 miles away from the city of Paducah.

References

Unincorporated communities in Ballard County, Kentucky
Unincorporated communities in Kentucky